The Lossi Gorilla Sanctuary is found in northwestern Republic of the Congo. It was established on 10 May 2001. The reserve was effectively created by the local community, who established an eco-tourism project here. It is also used for research.

References

Protected areas of the Republic of the Congo